A total of 38 hydroid species have been collected at the Houtman Abrolhos. 34 of these are leptothecates, the remainder being anthoathecates. 35 of them (92%) attach to temperate algae; the remaining, the others to coral rock. This is a list of hydroids of the Houtman Abrolhos:

Anthoathecatae
Corynidae
 Sarsia eximia
Candelabridae
 Candelabrum harrisoni
Eudendriidae
 Eudendrium ?minutum
Cytaeididae
 ?Perarella sp.

Leptothecatae

References

Hydrozoa
Hydroids of the Houtman Abrolhos
Lists of fauna of the Houtman Abrolhos